Giuseppe Firrao may refer to:

Giuseppe Firrao (seniore) (1670–1744), Italian cardinal, Cardinal Secretary of State
Giuseppe Firrao Jr. (1736–1830), Italian cardinal